WPSN (1590 AM is a radio station licensed to the city of Honesdale, Pennsylvania and serves a portion of the Scranton radio market (northeast of the city). The station broadcasts with 2,500 watts daytime, 15 watts nighttime with a non-directional signal pattern. It simulcasts on FM translator W282BF Honesdale on 104.3 MHz with 110 watts, on FM translator W273DM Hawley on 102.5 MHz with 250 watts, and on FM translator W270CC Hamlin on 101.9 MHz with 190 watts.

The station is owned by Bold Gold Media. WPSN broadcasts a news/talk format branded as "Wayne Pike News" including programming coming from Premiere Radio Networks's Rush Limbaugh and other talk shows

References

External links
Official Website

WPSN Daytime Signal Coverage Map According to Radio-Locator.com
WPSN Nighttime Signal Coverage Map According to Radio-Locator.com

PSN